Cory in the House is a 2008 adventure stealth video game for the Nintendo DS, based on the television series Cory in the House. Cory in the House was developed by Handheld Games Corporation and published by Disney Interactive Studios.

Gameplay and plot 
Cory in the House is an adventure game that requires the player to play as Cory Baxter, a teenager who lives with his father Victor Baxter after Victor gets accepted as head chef at The White House. The basic premise for the game is Cory, after winning a toy contest, starts an endeavor to sell bobbleheads depicting the President of the United States to the citizens of Washington, D.C. The bobbleheads are taken into possession by The Evil Toymaker, who tries to utilize the bobbleheads as a means of hypnotic technology on the population of Washington, D.C. Cory is tasked with retrieving the bobbleheads to stop the hypnosis plan.

The gameplay is an adventure stealth game, where the player controls Cory and his friends as they move through locations including halls in The White House, a school, a mall, and streets of Washington, D.C. Tasks involve sneaking past Secret Service agents, examining rooms for specific items, throwing pastries at hypnotized teachers, and talking to non-playable characters. Additional features include mini-games, which involve tapping the Nintendo DS stylus against the touchscreen along with music or simulating connecting electrical circuits.

Reception 

Cory in the House was critically panned, earning an overall score of 35% out of 100 on aggregate review website GameRankings. IGN's Jack DeVries criticized the gameplay controls, calling them "clunky" and "hard to control", and found fault with the game's included laugh track that goes along with the dialogue sequence jokes. Review website Game Boyz excoriated the game's gameplay, graphics, and sound, concluding that not even hardcore fans of the Cory in the House television series would appreciate it.

Due to satirical reviews on Metacritic in relation to an internet meme ironically describing the show as an "anime" series, the game has an average user score of 9.5, making it one of the highest user-rated DS games on the site.

References

External links 
 Cory in the House at Nintendo.com

2008 video games
Disney video games
Stealth video games
Nintendo DS games
Nintendo DS-only games
That's So Raven
Video games based on television series
Video games developed in the United States
White House in fiction
Video game memes
Single-player video games
Video games featuring black protagonists